Eric V of Saxe-Lauenburg (died 1436) was a member of the House of Ascania; son of Duke Eric IV of Saxe-Lauenburg and Sophia of Brunswick-Lüneburg. Eric V and his brother John IV jointly succeeded their father in 1412 as dukes of Saxe-Lauenburg. After John IV had died in 1414, Eric ruled alone.

Life
When Eric III of Saxe-Bergedorf-Mölln had died in 1401, Eric V's father, Eric IV, inherited the branch duchy of the deceased. Subsequently, he shared the reign in the reunited duchy with Eric V and his brother John. However, most of Eric III's branch duchy had been alienated, such as the Herrschaft of Mölln (sold to Lübeck in 1359 under a repurchase agreement) and the Herrschaft of Bergedorf, the Vierlande, half the Sachsenwald and Geesthacht, all of which Eric III had pawned to the city of Lübeck in 1370.

Eric III had entitled Lübeck to take possession of these areas, once he had deceased, until his heirs would repay the credit and thus redeem them and simultaneously exercise their right to repurchase Mölln, requiring together a total sum of 26,000 Lübeck marks. In 1401 Eric IV, supported by his sons Eric V and John IV, forcefully captured the pawned areas without any repayment, before Lübeck could take possession of them. Lübeck acquiesced. Their share in jurisdiction, Vogtei and castle had been acquired from the plague-stricken Knights of Bederkesa, who had dropped into decline after 1349/1350.

In 1420 Eric V attacked Frederick I, Elector of Brandenburg and Lübeck gained Hamburg for a war alliance in support of Brandenburg. Armies of both cities opened a second front and conquered Bergedorf, Riepenburg castle and the Esslingen river toll station (today's Zollenspieker Ferry) within weeks. This forced Eric V to agree to the Peace of Perleberg on 23 August 1420, which stipulated that all the pawned areas, which Eric V, Eric IV and John IV had violently taken in 1401, were to be irrevocably ceded to the cities of Hamburg and Lübeck.

When in 1422 the Ascanians died out in the Electorate of Saxony (Saxe-Wittenberg), which together with Saxe-Lauenburg had been partitioned from the Duchy of Saxony in 1296, Eric V aimed at reuniting Saxony in his hands. Especially he was after the Saxon electoral privilege, which had been disputed between Saxe-Lauenburg and Saxe-Wittenberg since John I had died in 1285. However, in 1356 Emperor Charles IV exclusively accepted Saxe-Wittenberg as electorate, with Saxe-Lauenburg not giving up its claim.

However, Sigismund, Holy Roman Emperor, had already granted Margrave Frederick IV the Warlike of Meissen an expectancy on the Saxon electorate, in order to remunerate his military support. On 1 August 1425 Sigismund enfeoffed the Wettinian Prince-Elector Frederick I of Saxony, despite protestations of the Ascanian Eric V.

Weakened in his position Eric's younger brother Bernard urged the duke to share his reign. In 1426 Eric V finally agreed and made Bernard the co-duke, who also succeeded him.

Marriages and issue
In 1404 Eric V married (1) Elisabeth of Holstein-Rendsburg (1360–1416), daughter of Nicholas, Count of Holstein-Rendsburg and widow of Albert IV, Duke of Mecklenburg. Eric V and Elisabeth had no common children.

Before 1422 Eric V married Elisabeth of Weinsberg (1397–after 1498), daughter of Conrad IX of Weinsberg. Their son Henry died young in 1437. Thus Eric V was succeeded by his younger brother Bernard II.
 * Henry (?–1437)

Henry died while staying with his maternal grandparents and was buried in today's Lutheran Town Church of St. George in Weikersheim, where this epitaph commemorates the boy.

References 
 Cordula Bornefeld, "Die Herzöge von Sachsen-Lauenburg", in: Die Fürsten des Landes: Herzöge und Grafen von Schleswig, Holstein und Lauenburg [De slevigske hertuger; German], Carsten Porskrog Rasmussen (ed.) on behalf of the Gesellschaft für Schleswig-Holsteinische Geschichte, Neumünster: Wachholtz, 2008, pp. 373–389.

Ancestry

Notes

|-

1436 deaths
Eric 05
Eric 05
Year of birth unknown